The 1977 Kvalserien was the third edition of the Kvalserien. It determined which two teams of the participating ones would play in the 1977–78 Elitserien season and which two teams would play in the 1977–78 Swedish Division 1 season.

Tournament

External links
Tournament on hockeyarchives.info

Kvalserien
Kval